Ralph Clark Collins (16 April 1924 – March 2007) was a Scottish football player and manager.

Bio 
He played as a defender for Airdrieonians, East Stirlingshire and Kilmarnock, making 325 appearances for the Ayrshire club. Collins captained Kilmarnock in the 1957 Scottish Cup Final.

After retiring as a player, Collins was manager of Airdrie, but resigned from that post in October 1970 due to the pressure of also working shift patterns in another job.

References

1924 births
2007 deaths
Scottish footballers
Footballers from Airdrie, North Lanarkshire
Association football fullbacks
Glasgow United F.C. players
Airdrieonians F.C. (1878) players
East Stirlingshire F.C. players
Kilmarnock F.C. players
Scottish football managers
Association football coaches
Airdrieonians F.C. (1878) non-playing staff
Airdrieonians F.C. (1878) managers
Scottish Junior Football Association players
Scottish Football League players
Scottish Football League managers